The 2020 Silverstone FIA Formula 2 round was a pair of motor races involving Formula 2 cars that took place on 8 and 9 August 2020 at the Silverstone Circuit in Silverstone, Great Britain. The event is the fifth round of the 2020 FIA Formula 2 Championship and ran in support of the 70th Anniversary Grand Prix.

Classification

Qualifying 

Notes
 Sean Gelael was given a five-place grid penalty for not having the correct number of tyres.

Feature Race

Sprint race 

Notes:
 – Sean Gelael was making the formation lap, but later returned into the pits after suffering a mechanical issue, forcing him to rule out of the race as a consequence.

Standings after the event

Drivers' Championship standings

Teams' Championship standings

 Note: Only the top five positions are included for both sets of standings.

See also 
2020 70th Anniversary Grand Prix
2020 2nd Silverstone Formula 3 round

References

External links 

Silverstone, 2nd